William Carmichael (1702–1765) was Archbishop of Dublin for a brief period in 1765.

He was the son of the second Earl of Hyndford.

He had previously been Archdeacon of Buckingham (1742–1753), Bishop of Clonfert and Kilmacduagh (1753–1758), Ferns and Leighlin (1758) and Meath (1758–1765).

He died on 15 December 1765.

References

1707 births
1765 deaths
Archdeacons of Buckingham
Bishops of Clonfert and Kilmacduagh
Bishops of Ferns and Leighlin
Anglican bishops of Meath
Anglican archbishops of Dublin
Members of the Privy Council of Ireland
Members of the Irish House of Lords